Carex atrata, called black alpine sedge, is a widespread species of flowering plant in the genus Carex, native to Greenland, Iceland, and most of Europe, plus scattered locations across temperate Asia, including Anatolia, Siberia and the Himalaya, as far as Taiwan and Japan. Its chromosome number is 2n=52, with some variants reported, e.g. n2=54 for Greenland material.

Subspecies
The following subspecies are currently accepted:
Carex atrata subsp. atrata
Carex atrata subsp. longistolonifera (Kük.) S.Yun Liang
Carex atrata subsp. pullata (Boott) Kük.

References

atrata
Taxa named by Carl Linnaeus
Plants described in 1753
Flora of Greenland